The Race Course Fire Memorial is a Hong Kong monument erected in memory to those who were killed in the Happy Valley Racecourse fire on 26 February 1918. The memorial was completed in 1922, and is currently managed by the Tung Wah Group of Hospitals. It is located next to Hong Kong Stadium. The site was added to the list of declared monuments by the Antiquities and Monuments Office in 2015.

In 2018-2019, the memorial was inaccessible because the only road leading to it was damaged by fallen trees during the Typhoon Mangkhut. The memorial is now open 8am-12pm and 1pm-4pm daily, except for the first three days of the Lunar New Year.

References

Declared monuments of Hong Kong
Landmarks in Hong Kong
So Kon Po
Buildings and structures completed in 1922